Aalim Muhammed Salegh College of Engineering is an engineering college affiliated to Anna University India, and Aalim Muhammed Salegh Polytechnic College in the same campus, where diploma courses are available, located in Muthapudupet, Chennai, Tamil Nadu.

Facilities
 Library
 Digital Library
 Counseling
 Hostel
 Transport
 Infrastructure
 Insurance
 Gymnasium
 Sports indoor and outdoor games
 Personality Development
 Internet 24x7
 CPCD CELL

Courses

Under graduate

B.E.
Computer Science 
Electronic and Communication 
Electric and Electronic 
Civil 
Mechanical

B.Tech
Information Technology

B.Arch
Architecture.

Post graduate
Master in Business Administration
Master in Computer Application

References

External links
 

Engineering colleges in Chennai
Colleges affiliated to Anna University
Educational institutions established in 1990
1990 establishments in Tamil Nadu